Denys Viktorovych Kuzyk (born 18 September 2002) is a Ukrainian professional footballer who plays as a left-back for Lviv, on loan from Dynamo Kyiv.

Club career

Early years
Started his career at DYuSSh Pidvolochysk. His first coach was Valeriy Kolotiy.

Dynamo Kyiv

Loan to Chornomorets Odesa
In July 2021, he moved on loan to Chornomorets Odesa.
On 25 July 2021, he made his league debut in the losing away match against Desna Chernihiv at the Chernihiv Stadium.

Loan to Lviv
In January 2023 he moved on loan to Lviv.

References

External links
 
 

2002 births
Living people
Ukrainian footballers
Association football defenders
Ukrainian Premier League players
FC Dynamo Kyiv players
FC Chornomorets Odesa players
FC Kolos Kovalivka players
Ukraine under-21 international footballers
Sportspeople from Ternopil Oblast